The Acobamba District is one of the eight districts in the Acobamba Province in Peru. It was created by Law No. 9718 on January 15, 1943. Its capital is Acobamba.

Ethnic groups 
The people in the district are mainly Indigenous citizens of Quechua descent. Quechua is the language which the majority of the population (62.07%) learnt to speak in childhood, 37.64% of the residents started speaking using the Spanish language (2007 Peru Census).

See also 
 Killa Mach'ay

References

External links
  Official municipal website